Aleksandre Bakshi (born 23 July 1997) is a Georgian tennis player.

Bakshi has a career high ATP singles ranking of World No. 816 achieved on 1 November 2021. He also has a career high ATP doubles ranking of World No. 556 achieved on 9 May 2022. Bakshi has won one ITF doubles title.

Bakshi represents Georgia at the Davis Cup, where he has a W/L record of 4–3.

He participated at the 2020 ATP Cup and at the 2022 ATP Cup as one of the five members of the Georgian team.

ATP Challenger and ITF Futures finals

Singles: 1 (1–0)

Doubles 6 (1–5)

Davis Cup

Participations: (4–3)

   indicates the outcome of the Davis Cup match followed by the score, date, place of event, the zonal classification and its phase, and the court surface.

References

External links

1997 births
Living people
Male tennis players from Georgia (country)
Sportspeople from Tbilisi
Oklahoma Sooners men's tennis players
Texas A&M Aggies men's tennis players